Hebron is a town near Nsawam in southern Ghana and in the Nsawam-Adoagyire Municipal District, a district in the Eastern Region of south Ghana. Hebron falls under the administrative district of Nsawam-Adoagyire Municipal District (ASMD). Hebron is situated on the main Accra to Nsawam a highway to Kumasi.

Prayer Camp
Hebron is the location of a prayer camp called Hebron prayer camp which is under the Church of Pentecost.

Climate

References

External links 
 Ghana-pedia webpage - Nsawam

 	

Populated places in the Eastern Region (Ghana)